Nicholas Hope (born 25 December 1958) is a British-born Australian actor.

Born in Manchester, England, Hope's family emigrated to the steel and ship building town of Whyalla, South Australia, where he was educated by the Christian Brothers.

He played the lead role in Bad Boy Bubby (1993), for which he won the Australian Film Institute Best Actor in a Leading Role award in 1994. He continues to work in film, theatre and television in Australia and Europe. He lives in Sydney, Australia. He also appeared in The School in 2018 and Moon Rock For Monday directed by Kurt Martin and produced by Jim Robison in 2021. 

In 2004, he published a memoir called Brushing the Tip of Fame, and in 2006 produced a monologue "The Colour of Panic", which played in Sydney (The Studio, Sydney Opera House) and Oslo (Det Åpne Teater).

A portrait of Hope appears in the National Portrait Gallery.

Partial filmography
 Confessor Caressor (1989)
 Bad Boy Bubby (1993) – Bubby
 Exile (1994)
 Little White Lies (1996)
 Henry Fool (1997) – Father Hawkes
 The Goddess of 1967 (2000) – Grandpa
 Scooby-Doo (2002) – Old Man Smithers
 Paradise Found (2003) – Maurrin
 Anacondas: The Hunt for the Blood Orchid (2004) – Christian Van Dyke
 Who Killed Dr Bogle and Mrs Chandler? (2006) – Geoffrey Chandler
 Uro (2006)
 Bitter Flowers (2007) – Warren Donaldson
 The Prime Minister Is Missing (2008) – William McMahon
 3 Acts of Murder (2009) – Harry Manning
 Redd Inc. (2012)
 Double Happiness Uranium (2013)
 Gallipoli (2015) - Walter Braithwaite 
 The Daughter (2015) - Peterson
 Truth (2015) - Marcel Matley
 Ash vs Evil Dead (2016) - Professor Raymond Knowby
 Cleverman (2017) - Dr. Mitchell
 The School (2018)) - Dr. Peter Masuta
 Picnic at Hanging Rock (2018) - Colonel Fitzhubert
 Henry Needs a New Home (short film) (2018) - Henry
 Moon Rock For Monday (2021) - The Bobbins
The Drover's Wife (2021)
 Limbo  (2023)

References

External links
 Australia: The Dream is Dead, article written by Hope 
 Interview from July 2004
 
 Hope takes the rap

1958 births
Australian male film actors
Australian male television actors
English emigrants to Australia
Living people
Male actors from Manchester
Male actors from South Australia
People from Whyalla
20th-century Australian male actors
21st-century Australian male actors